Seyed Mehdi Eslami (born May 5, 1985 in Iran) is an Iranian football goalkeeper, who currently plays for Machine Sazi in Iran Pro League.

Club career

Club career statistics

Honours

Club
Esteghlal
Hazfi Cup (1): 2011–12

References

External links
 Seyed Mehdi Eslami at PersianLeague

Iranian footballers
1985 births
Living people
PAS Hamedan F.C. players
Shahrdari Bandar Abbas players
Esteghlal F.C. players
Machine Sazi F.C. players
Association football goalkeepers